Eonatator is an extinct genus of marine lizard belonging to the mosasaur family. It is a close relative of Halisaurus, and part of the same subfamily, the Halisaurinae. It is known from the Late Cretaceous of North America, Colombia and Sweden. Originally, this taxon was included within Halisaurus, but was placed in its own genus, which also led to the subfamily Halisaurinae being created for the two genera.

Discovery and naming 
Eonatator is known from the Smoky Hill Chalk Member of the Niobrara Chalk Formation (Late Coniacian to Early Campanian) of Kansas, from the Eutaw Formation (Santonian) and Mooreville Chalk Formation (Selma Group; Santonian-Lower Campanian) of Alabama (United States), from the Kristianstad Basin of southern Sweden (late early Campanian), and the unit Nivel de Lutitas y Arenas (Campanian) of the Olini Group in La Mesa, Colombia.

The name Eonatator means "dawn swimmer" (Greek eos = dawn + Latin natator = swimmer). Originally, it contained only a single species, E. sternbergii. The species is named in honour of Charles H. Sternberg and his son, Levi, who discovered the type specimen in the Niobrara Chalk during the summer of 1918. A second species, E. coellensis, was named for the town of Coello in the Department of Tolima in Colombia, near of which it was discovered.

Description 
 
Bardet et al. (2005, p. 465) diagnose Eonatator sternbergii as follows: "Ambiguous characters: premaxilla-maxilla lateral suture ending posterior to 9th maxillary teeth; tail about 40% of the head and trunk length (convergent in mosasaurines); caudal vertebra length greater than width; fewer than four pygal vertebrae; femur length about twice distal width (convergent in Clidastes). Autapomorphies: parietal with smooth triangular table extending very far posteriorly, bearing medium-sized circular foramen, located at distance twice its diameter from the frontal-parietal suture, and surrounded anteriorly and posteriorly by two parallel ridges; rounded quadrate with regularly convex tympanic ala (wing); vertebral formula: seven cervicals, 24 dorsals, four pygals, 28 median caudals and at least 41 terminal caudals; humerus length approximately 2.5x distal width." E. coellensis is diagnosed by more retracted nostrils, between the 7 and the 17 maxillary teeth, premaxilla and maxilla with a short rostrum anterior to the first teeth; presence of a septomaxilla, a large prefrontal that makes most of the margin of the outer nostril, a short and wide frontal, a parietal foramen located near of the fronto-parietal suture, a triangular surface of the parietal with two medial depressions and 22 caudal vertebrae.

Still, it is remarkable for having remains of soft tissue in the ear region, the neck, thoracic and the abdominal region. Under the pygal vertebrae and the seventeenth dorsal vertebra there is a series of 20 small vertebrae centra and a flattened bone, that together measure  in length. It have features of the mosasauroids, with three vertebrae with haemal arches and procoelic centra, that suggest the possibility that these small bones belong to an embryo of this species, although the lack of diagnostic fossils like the skull or teeth prevents a complete identification. In any case, it will be consequent with the ovoviviparism previously reported in mosasauroids like Carsosaurus.

Classification 
Like many mosasaurs, this genus has a complicated taxonomic history. The type specimen (UPI R 163, Uppsala University Palaeontological Institute, Uppsala, Sweden), a nearly complete skeleton, was originally referred to the genus Clidastes by Wiman and then to Halisaurus by Russell. Hence, Clidastes sternbergii became Halisaurus sternbergii. Although some agreed with this generic attribution, other paleontologists suggested that while H. sternbergii did not belong to Clidastes, its designation under Halisaurus is questionable; Lingham-Soliar (1996) referred H. sternbergii to C. sternbergii again, but this has found no acceptance in other researchers.

In 2005, Halisaurus sternbergii was reassigned to its own genus, Eonatator by Nathalie Bardet and colleagues along with the description of Halisaurus arambourgi and the creation of the subfamily Halisaurinae. In the same year, Lindgren and Siverson suggested that Eonatator is an invalid junior synonym and should be classified as H. sternbergii, but this has found no acceptance in other researchers who used the genus name Eonatator instead.

Below is a cladogram following an analysis by Takuya Konishi and colleagues (2016) done during the description of Phosphorosaurus ponpetelegans, which showcases the internal relationships within the Halisaurinae. The analysis excluded the dubious Halisaurus onchognathus and the genus Pluridens.

References

Further reading 
 Lindgren J, Siverson M. 2005. Halisaurus sternbergii, a small mosasaur with an intercontinental distribution. Journal of Paleontology 79 (4): 763–773.

External links 

 Kansas Mosasaurs in Sweden: the type specimen of Eonatator (Halisaurus) sternbergi Wiman 1920 @  Oceans of Kansas, very good photographs of type specimen

Russellosaurins
Santonian genus first appearances
Campanian genus extinctions
Mosasaurs of South America
Late Cretaceous reptiles of South America
Cretaceous Colombia
Fossils of Colombia
Mosasaurs of Europe
Late Cretaceous reptiles of Europe
Fossils of Sweden
Fossil taxa described in 2005
Taxa named by María Páramo